Val Suran is a commune in the department of Jura, eastern France. The municipality was established on 1 January 2017 by merger of the former communes of Saint-Julien (the seat), Bourcia, Louvenne and Villechantria.

See also 
Communes of the Jura department

References 

Communes of Jura (department)